Henry H. Dupont was an American architect. He practiced from Indianapolis, Indiana, and then Pinellas County, Florida.

Career
DuPont designed Bona Thompson Memorial Library in Irvington, Indiana, the eclectic Masonic Temple and Hall School. In Pinellas County, Florida, he designed the Don CeSar Hotel and Casa De Muchas Flores. He was involved in developing Von Duprin. Dupont announced his move to Florida in 1915, with an office in St. Petersburg's Central National Bank Building.

Works

Hall School
Casa De Muchas Flores, Pinellas County, Florida
Veillard House (1901) for Ralph Veillard, a Queen Anne style bungalow listed on the National Register of Historic Places in 1982. Two-story masonry and balloon frame house with a front porch and bell-cast gable roof punctuated by two oversized dormers on a corner lot on 4th Ave N in downtown St Petersburg, Florida.
Edward T. Lewis home, St. Petersburg

Further reading
Building Age, Volume 45 David Williams Company, 1923 page 30
Beautiful Bungalows of the Twenties, Building Age Publishing Corporation, Dover Publications, Sep 16, 2003 page 3
(Re)constructing the Little Red Schoolhouse: History, Landscape and Memory, Joanne Raetz Stuttgen Indiana University, 2002 - 492 pages Pages 166, 168

References

Architects from Indianapolis
Architects from Florida